Castanopsis psilophylla is a tree in the family Fagaceae. The specific epithet  is from the Greek meaning "smooth leaves".

Description
The brown bark is smooth or with fine fissures.

Distribution and habitat
Castanopsis psilophylla grows naturally in Borneo and the Philippines. Its habitat is hill dipterocarp forests up to  altitude.

References

psilophylla
Trees of Borneo
Plants described in 1968
Flora of Palawan
Flora of the Borneo lowland rain forests